Nooshin Tafi (is an Iranian traditional music singer. She is well known for her debut duet album To Ra Ey Kohan Boomo Bar Doost Daram, which became controversial.

References 

1981 births
Living people
Iranian classical singers
People from Andimeshk
21st-century Iranian women singers
Date of birth missing (living people)